Jiming Song from Iowa State University, Ames, IA was named Fellow of the Institute of Electrical and Electronics Engineers (IEEE) in 2014 for contributions to algorithms in computational electromagnetics.

References

External links
Iowa State Bio

Fellow Members of the IEEE
Living people
Year of birth missing (living people)
Place of birth missing (living people)
Iowa State University faculty